Daliu is a township in Yunyang District (formerly known as Yun County) in the Qin Mountains of northwestern Hubei province, China, located more than  north-northwest of the county seat and  north of downtown Shiyan. The township administers 12 villages.

Administrative divisions
, Daliu Township had twelve villages under its administration:
 Yangjia, Shizigou, Jintang, Zuoxisi, Huanglongmiao, Songshuwan, Daliushu, Yuliang, Huajiahe, Gangzigou, Shuangping, Baiquan

Demographics 
Daliu Township has a population of 11,762 according to the 2010 Chinese Census, down from the 14,195 recorded in the 2000 Chinese Census.

The township has a hukou population of 14,143 as of 2019, up slightly from 14,138 in 2018.

See also 
 List of township-level divisions of Hubei

References 

Township-level divisions of Hubei
Yunyang District